Inishturk (Inis Toirc in Irish, meaning Wild Boar Island) is a small island and a townland of County Galway, in Ireland. The island is also referred as Inishturk South  (Irish: Inis Toirc Theas) in order to tell it apart from the Inishturk island located in County Mayo.

Geography 

Inisturk lies off the Irish coast not faraway from Clifden and Cleggan. It is located between Turbot (or Inishturbot, South) and Omey Island (North). On the hill topping the island stands a radio-TV mast. The easiest place to land on Inishturk is the SE part of the island.

History 
A small community used to live on the island up to the mid-20th century, but it later become uninhabited. At the end of the 20th century some old buildings were transformed into holiday houses.

Demographics 
The table below shows data on Inisturk's population taken from Discover the Islands of Ireland (Alex Ritsema, Collins Press, 1999) and the Census of Ireland.

See also
 List of islands of Ireland

References

Islands of County Galway
Townlands of County Galway